Bockenheim is a quarter of Frankfurt, Germany. It was incorporated into Frankfurt on 1 April 1895 and is part of the Ortsbezirk Innenstadt II.

Bockenheim lies west of central Frankfurt and is the third largest district by population in Frankfurt after Sachsenhausen and the Nordend with approximately 42,000 inhabitants.

Bockenheim is bordered by the Goethe University, the Senckenberg museum and the Frankfurt Trade Fair in the south. The Bockenheimer Depot was the central tram depot, built around 1900, which is now a theatre, a venue of the Städtische Bühnen Frankfurt. Bockenheim also houses the headquarters of the Deutsche Bundesbank.

References

Districts of Frankfurt